is one of the 100 Famous Japanese Mountains, reaching the height of . It is situated in Japan's Kubiki Mountains in Niigata Prefecture. It was specified for Jōshin'etsu Kōgen National Park on July 10, 1956, but since has been absorbed by the Togakushi-Renzan National Park, which encompasses Mount Myōkō (妙高山 Myōkō-san) and Mount Niigata-Yake (新潟焼山 Niigata-Yakeyama).

Outline 
The surrounding area is deep snow country. This mountain is famous for the many alpine plants found above the tree line. The Siberian Dwarf Pine can be seen here, together with fauna such as the Rock Ptarmigan. There are several climbing routes to the top of the mountain, principally from Sasagemine after the annual spring re-opening of the road. The Kōya-ike pond along the route is noted for its autumn foliage. Accommodation in the alpine environment are the Kōya mountain hut with campground, and the Kurosawa-ike hut also with campground. Both are located is to the southeast of the peak on the mountain trail system.

Sumie Tanaka selected this mountain as one of the "100 famous flower mountains of Japan".

Scenery of Mount Hiuchi

See also

 Jōshin'etsu Kōgen National Park
 List of mountains in Japan
 List of Ultras of Japan
 100 Famous Japanese Mountains

References

External links
 "Hiuchi-yama, Japan" on Peakbagger

Mountains of Niigata Prefecture
Highest points of Japanese national parks